Lake Mary Ronan is a census-designated place (CDP) in Lake County, Montana, United States. The population was 65 at the 2010 census. The CDP is in northwestern Lake County, along the northern and eastern shores of Lake Mary Ronan, and includes the populated places of Lake Mary Ronan, Melton, and Sipes, as well as Lake Mary Ronan State Park.

Demographics

References

Census-designated places in Lake County, Montana
Census-designated places in Montana